The Kulmerland was a supply ship of the Kriegsmarine that operated during the Second World War in the Indian Ocean and Pacific Ocean. It was named after the Kulmerland region of Prussia, with the city of Kulm (modern Chełmno), which in 1920 was made part of the Polish Corridor.

She supplied German auxiliary ships (surface raiders) such as the Kormoran, Orion and Komet, for a time disguised as a Japanese merchant ship Tokyo Maru.

Kulmerland was built in 1928 at Deutsche Werft, Hamburg, for the Hamburg America Line, operating on the North Atlantic route.

After her operations in the Pacific she returned to Europe via the Cape of Good Hope, arriving at Nantes in 1943, but was trapped there. On 23 September 1943 she was damaged during an air raid. The ship was scuttled in August 1944 during the German retreat. She was refloated in 1945, but further repairs were abandoned. She was eventually towed to Briton Ferry, Wales, in 1950 for scrapping.

References

External links
The supply ship Kulmerland Photo
German Raiders in the Pacific: The Komet Enters the Pacific

1928 ships
Ships built in Hamburg
Ships of the Hamburg America Line
World War II auxiliary ships of Germany